Loxahatchee may refer to:

 Loxahatchee, Florida
 Loxahatchee River, Florida
 Battles of the Loxahatchee in the Second Seminole War
 Loxahatchee National Wildlife Refuge, Florida